The Round Lake Wilderness Area, an Adirondack Park unit of New York's Forest Preserve, is located in the town of Long Lake in Hamilton County.

There are eleven designated campsites on Round Lake, created in 2007.  In addition to Round Lake, the area includes a stretch of the Bog River Flow, Hitchens Pond, Trout Pond and several smaller ponds.

See also
 List of Wilderness Areas in the Adirondack Park

References

External links
 

Wilderness areas in Adirondack Park
Protected areas of Hamilton County, New York